Oeax collaris is a species of beetle in the family Cerambycidae. It was described by Karl Jordan in 1903.

References

Ancylonotini
Beetles described in 1903